Peter Noble (1944-2017) was a British footballer.

Peter Noble may also refer to:

Peter Noble (academic) (1899–1987), British academic
Peter Noble (music promoter), Australian entrepreneur
Fin (comics), a fictional character

See also
Peter Nobel (born 1931), Swedish lawyer